Brīvzemnieki Parish is an administrative territorial entity of Limbaži Municipality, Latvia. It was an administrative unit of Limbaži District. The administrative center is Puikule village.

Towns, villages and settlements of Brīvzemnieki Parish 
 Buiva
 Ozoli
 Ozolmuiža
 Puikule

See also 
 Ozolmuiža Manor
 Puikule Manor

External links 
 

Parishes of Latvia
Limbaži Municipality
Vidzeme